Ashutosh Pattnaik (born on 18 October 1987) is an Indian filmmaker, director, and lyricist.

Early life
Ashutosh was born to Baijayantimala Mohanty and Prafulla Kumar Pattnaik in an Odia family from Puri, Odisha. He went to Biswambhar Bidyapitha, Puri and subsequently attended Intermediate Science at HDV Science College, Panaspada. Then he completed BCA in NICE under Sambalpur University and animation diploma at Pentasoft, Bhubaneswar. He is a student of cinematography at Biju Pattnaik Film and TV Institute, Cuttack, Odisha.

Career

2015
He directed a short film A Race for Resistance on water scarcity. Then he directed a documentary Independence based upon people reviews and Khusi.

2016
He directed his short add film The Butterfly in Odia language about girl child discrimination issue which was awarded 3rd Prize at Kallola Film Festival organised by Aaina organization with Unicef.

He set up a music production company Pattnaik Bros. He started his first professional work as a lyricist and producer in the album Eka Eka Jibanare in Odia language.

His other notable works in 2016 are Think for a second, Sambalpuri Weavers- knitted with hopes and dreams about the struggle of the Sambalpuri Weavers, Upahar by BPFTIO (Biju Pattnaik Film & Television Institute of Odisha), The Sixth Element, Chapter-4

2017
He directed a short movie Tara Can which got 1st prize in 5 minute category in We Care Film Fest, 2017.

Filmography

References

1989 births
Living people
Cinematographers from Odisha
Film directors from Odisha
Indian filmmakers
Indian lyricists
People from Puri
Sambalpur University alumni